Aidan Smith (born 11 May 1997) is a Scottish footballer who plays for Annan Athletic as a striker. Smith has previously played for Queen of the South and Peterhead.

Career
Born in Dumfries, Smith started his career at hometown club Queen of the South. Smith was first named in a match-day squad on 24 August 2013, remaining an unused substitute in the team's 2–0 defeat away to Hamilton Academical in the Scottish Championship. Smith was a named substitute for six other matches that season, although he was unused.

On 6 March 2015, Smith debuted in the quarter-finals of the Scottish Cup, replacing Gavin Reilly for the final 11 minutes of the 1–0 defeat at Palmerston Park versus Falkirk. Four days later, Smith made his league debut at Ibrox versus Rangers, replacing Reilly once again in the 83rd minute and three minutes later the 17-year-old scored his first career league goal, exploiting a mistake by goalkeeper Lee Robinson to earn a 1–1 draw for the Doonhamers.

Smith was then loaned out to Annan Athletic for the first half of the 2016–17 season, with the loan deal then extended until the end of the season on 7 January 2017. His contract with Queens wasn't renewed during May 2017, so he was released after spending seven seasons in the youth set-up at Palmerston from 2008 until 2015 and then two seasons in the first-team squad. On 14 June 2017, Smith signed a permanent deal with Annan Athletic, after a season-long spell on loan at Galabank from Queens during the 2016–17 season.

On 24 June 2019, Smith signed for Peterhead after two seasons with the Galabankies. He left Peterhead after one season, and returned to Annan in September 2020.

Statistics

References

External links

1997 births
Living people
Footballers from Dumfries
Scottish footballers
Association football forwards
Queen of the South F.C. players
Annan Athletic F.C. players
Scottish Professional Football League players
Peterhead F.C. players